Linn Natassia Malthe (born 19 January 1974) is a Norwegian model and actress.

Early life and career
Malthe is the second of two daughters. She was born in Oslo, Norway, to a Norwegian father and Malaysian mother from Kota Kinabalu, Sabah. Her parents met while on a trip to Toronto. She is usually credited by her birth name but is sometimes credited as "Lina Teal".

In Scotland and Norway, Malthe went to dance schools at the Goh Ballet Academy, and the Norwegian National Opera and Ballet respectively, where she sang and danced while finishing high school. Later she moved to London, England to study musical theater. From there she went to Los Angeles and landed her first part on television.

In 2005, Natassia Malthe, along with Jennifer Garner, was nominated at the MTV Movie Awards for Best Kiss.

In 2009, Malthe starred as an elf bounty-hunter and sorceress-in-training in the Sci Fi Channel miniseries Knights of Bloodsteel. She also does fashion modeling and is among the Girls of Maxim and Toro Women.                                     

In 2011, Malthe starred as a Dhanphir Agent named Rayne in the action-adventure movie BloodRayne: The Third Reich.

Personal life
In 2017, Malthe joined numerous other women in accusing film producer Harvey Weinstein of sexual improprieties.

Filmography

Film

Television

References

External links

1974 births
Living people
Norwegian television actresses
Norwegian film actresses
Actresses from Oslo
Norwegian people of Malaysian descent
Norwegian female models
20th-century Norwegian actresses
21st-century Norwegian actresses
Models from Oslo